The 1894 Nevada gubernatorial election was held on November 6, 1894.

Incumbent Republican Governor Roswell K. Colcord did not stand for re-election. 

Silver Party nominee John Edward Jones defeated Republican nominee Abner Coburn Cleveland, Populist nominee George Peckham, and Democratic nominee Theodore Winters with 49.87% of the vote.

General election

Candidates
George Peckham, Populist
Abner Coburn Cleveland, Republican, former State Senator
Theodore Winters, Democratic, Democratic nominee for Governor in 1890
John Edward Jones, Silver, Surveyor General of Nevada

Results

References

1894
Nevada
Gubernatorial